Middlesex School is a coeducational, non-sectarian, day and boarding independent secondary school for grades 9-12 located in Concord, Massachusetts. It was founded as an all-boys school in 1901 by a Roxbury Latin School alumnus, Frederick Winsor, who headed the school until 1937. Middlesex began admitting girls in 1974. The school is a member of the prestigious Independent School League and is one of five schools collectively known as St. Grottlesex. 

The school was named for the county Middlesex in which it stands.  The campus was designed by the Olmsted Brothers architectural firm, and the firm Peabody and Stearns designed most of the main buildings. A recent addition is the Clay Centennial Center, completed in 2003, which hosts science and math classes as well as an observatory with an 18-inch research grade telescope.

The school is 70% boarding students and 30% day students. In 2019-20, boarding students came from 24 states and 20 countries. Middlesex School is highly selective, accepting only 14% of students who applied to enter in 2022-23.

Campus and facilities

The Middlesex School campus is located in Concord, Massachusetts, about 20 miles outside of Boston. Most of the campus buildings are located around The Circle, a grassy field at the center of the school. There are four dorms for boys (Clay, Landry, Robert Winsor, and Atkins) and five dorms for girls (Bryant-Payne, Higginson, Hallowell, LeBaron Briggs, and Kravis). There are three academic buildings: the Clay Centennial Center, constructed in 2003, Eliot Hall, which also houses several administrative offices, and the Rachel Carson Music and Campus Center, which houses the music, drama, and Spanish classes. In January 2019, the School opened the new Bass Arts Pavilon, a complex that contains two theaters, a gallery, and enhanced studio space for visual arts. The Warburg Library, besides housing Middlesex's collection of books and magazines, also contains classrooms and the Middlesex Archives. The dining hall is located in Ware Hall, as well as more administrative offices and the student center. Many members of the faculty live on campus, either in dorms or in several faculty houses.

At Middlesex, there are two turf fields for field hockey and lacrosse, five grass fields (for soccer, lacrosse, and football), a wrestling room, a dance studio, a baseball diamond, eight outdoor tennis courts, eight squash courts, two basketball courts, an ice rink, a boathouse and large pond (Bateman's Pond) for crew, and a fitness center (the James Oates '65 Center).

Students
Middlesex has 405 students from 21 countries and 24 states. 12% of students are international students (based upon citizenship) and 32% are racially non-white. 70% of the school are boarders and 30% are day students. All students are in grades 9-12.

As of 2022–2023 tuition is $69,280 for boarders and $55,970 for day students. Need-based financial aid supports 35% of the student body, with an average aid grant of $54,603 and a total of over $7.2 million.

Faculty
Middlesex School has 95 members of the faculty. In 2018-19, 76 percent of the teaching faculty have an advanced degree.

Academics
The average class size at Middlesex is 12. Middlesex offers 23 AP (Advanced Placement) classes with at least one in every department: English, Math, Sciences, Computer Sciences, Social Science (including History), Modern Languages, Classics, and Arts.

For the class of 2018, the mean Middlesex SAT score was 1410. 77% of the AP tests taken by Middlesex students in 2018 had scores of 4 or 5 and 96% of AP tests taken had scores of 3, 4, or 5.

Arts
Middlesex offers several art courses and extracurriculars.  AP Art History, AP Studio Art, and AP Music Theory are offered. The Chamber Ensemble and the Jazz Orchestra both require an audition as of 2020.

Athletics 
Middlesex fields teams in 17 different sports and competes in the Independent School League. The fall sports are football, cross country, volleyball, soccer, and field hockey; the winter sports are wrestling, dance, squash, ice hockey, alpine skiing, and basketball; the spring sports are crew, lacrosse, baseball, tennis, track, and golf.

Middlesex's primary athletic rival is the St. George's School.

Extracurricular activities
Besides the arts and athletics programs, there are several dozen student-run clubs that receive funding from the school administration, including the student Senate, Young Democrats Club, Young Republicans Club, two book clubs, Short Story Society, Robotics Club, Math Club, Politically Incorrect Debate Club, Society of Latinos, GSA, French Club, Science Club, JSA (the Junior Statesmen of America), Common Sense (an environmental club), Middlesex Couture, Finance Club, Zebrettes (a club that sponsors activities that connect students with young faculty children), and more.

The Middlesex student newspaper is The Anvil, which releases several physical issues as well as online content through its website. An Anvil tradition is the annual Anvil Poll, which polls the student body on itself. The Middlesex literary publication is The Iris, which contains short stories, poetry, drawings, and photos sent in by students.

Community service
Middlesex offers several community service programs. Students may help clean up a soup kitchen at Open Table (weekly), serve food and clean at a food pantry at Cor Unum (on long weekends), talk to people at a home for the elderly at Walden House (weekly), visit the elderly at Sunday Visits (special schedule), and help small children learn to skate at Gazebo (special schedule). Every fall, all students participate in a Community Service Day instead of going to classes. Several student Community Service Officers, all seniors, help manage the program.

Juniors may participate in the Youth in Philanthropy Program, which focuses on teaching students the techniques behind philanthropy and provides $10,000 for the students to distribute to worthy causes annually.

Every summer, the school sponsors a community service trip to the Linawo Children's Home in South Africa, where students tour the surrounding area, learn about South African culture and history, and assist in the operation of the shelter.

Chapel program

The Middlesex community (the entire student body and faculty and staff) meets weekly in the school chapel for a speech given by a senior on the topic of the senior's choosing. Most speeches are given by one senior, though 'dual chapels' (chapel speeches given by two seniors) are permitted. Spots in the chapel program are allocated in the beginning of the school year.

Throughout the year, there are also several class chapels (gatherings involving one grade) and a few evening chapels, which are given by faculty members and outside speakers.

Notable alumni

Conrad Aiken - Pulitzer Prize-winning author and poet
Paget Brewster - actress
Steve Carell - actor and comedian 
Joseph S. Clark Jr. - former U.S. Senator from Pennsylvania and mayor of Philadelphia
James L. Halperin - numismatist and author 
William Hurt - Academy Award-winning actor 
Joseph Kahn - Managing editor, The New York Times
Mark P. Lagon - American political scientist and human rights campaigner
Mills Lane - Nevada Judge, D.A, TV personality, professional boxing referee
Henry Cabot Lodge, Jr. - former U.S. Senator from Massachusetts and 1960 Republican vice presidential nominee
Robin Moore - writer
Bill Richardson - former Governor of New Mexico and U.S. ambassador to the United Nations
Bret Stephens - Op-ed columnist, The New York Times
Cass Sunstein - former head of President Obama's Office of Information and Regulatory Affairs, Robert Walmsley University Professor at Harvard Law School, columnist at Bloomberg Opinion
Robert Egerton Swartwout - author
Kevin Systrom - founder of Instagram
Shunsuke Tsurumi - Japanese philosopher
Jessica Tuck - actress
Chris Van Hollen - senator from Maryland.
Edward Warburg (1908-1992), philanthropist, patron of the arts.
Frederick M. Warburg - investment banker
Paul F. Warburg - investment banker
William Weld - former Governor of Massachusetts, Vice Presidential candidate

References

External links

Profile on Boarding School Review.com
Middlesex Graduates for Estabrook Homepage
Two Middlesex Alumnae Protest Development of Estabrook
Middlesex School Summer Arts Website
Middlesex School on Instagram. Archived from the original on ghostarchive.org
 

1901 establishments in Massachusetts
Boarding schools in Massachusetts
Buildings and structures in Concord, Massachusetts
Co-educational boarding schools
Cummings and Sears buildings
Educational institutions established in 1901
Independent School League
Peabody and Stearns buildings
Private high schools in Massachusetts
Private preparatory schools in Massachusetts
Schools in Middlesex County, Massachusetts